Church of Finland may refer to:
Evangelical Lutheran Church of Finland
Orthodox Church of Finland

See also 
 Religion in Finland